Harry Haddington (7 August 1931 – 2010) was an English professional footballer who played for Scarborough, Bradford Park Avenue, West Bromwich Albion, Walsall and Worcester City.

Honours
with Walsall
Football League Fourth Division champion: 1959–60

References

1931 births
2010 deaths
Sportspeople from Scarborough, North Yorkshire
English footballers
Association football defenders
Scarborough F.C. players
Bradford (Park Avenue) A.F.C. players
West Bromwich Albion F.C. players
Walsall F.C. players
Worcester City F.C. players
English Football League players